Robert Dumont was a French bobsledder who competed in the late 1940s. He won a bronze medal in the four-man event at the 1947 FIBT World Championships in St. Moritz.

References
Bobsleigh four-man world championship medalists since 1930

French male bobsledders
Possibly living people
Year of birth missing